Ficus pellucida, common name the Atlantic fig shell, is a species of sea snail, a marine gastropod mollusk in the family Ficidae, the fig shells.

Distribution
This species is distributed in the Caribbean Sea (along Cuba and Hispaniola), the Lesser Antilles and in the Atlantic Ocean from Venezuela to East Brazil.

Description 
The maximum recorded shell length is 70 mm.
Exoskeletons of Ficus pellucida

Habitat 
The minimum recorded depth for this species is 73 m; maximum recorded depth is 823 m.

References

 Verhaeghe, M. & Poppe, G. T., 2000 A Conchological Iconography (3), The Family Ficidae page(s): 20

External links
 

Ficidae
Gastropods described in 1856